Danilava (formerly ) is a village in Kėdainiai district municipality, in Kaunas County, in central Lithuania. According to the 2011 census, the village has a population of 9 people. It is located 0.5 km from Gudžiūnai, by the  Jonava-Šeduva road.

Demography

References

Villages in Kaunas County
Kėdainiai District Municipality